Umm Hawta (also spelled Umm Houta) is a village in southern Qatar, located in the municipality of Al Rayyan.

The village of Al Aamriya, to the south, is nearby.

Qatar's armed forces operate a military installation known as Umm Hawta Camp in the area.

Gallery

References

Populated places in Al Rayyan